The Siegel–Schwall Reunion Concert is an album by the Siegel–Schwall Band.  It was recorded live in 1987, and released by Alligator Records in 1988.

The Siegel–Schwall Band formed in Chicago in 1964.  After a few years of playing locally, they became a national touring act, and stayed together until 1974, releasing ten albums.  In 1987, they got back together and performed a reunion concert at the Vic Theatre in Chicago.  The concert was broadcast live on radio station WXRT-FM.  The Siegel–Schwall Reunion Concert consists of selections from that concert.

Since the reunion concert, the Siegel–Schwall Band has performed live on an occasional basis.  In 2005 they released a new album of all original material called Flash Forward.

Track listing
"You Don't Love Me Like That" (Jim Schwall) – 4:03
"Devil" (Corky Siegel) – 5:27
"Leavin'" (Schwall) – 3:10
"Hey, Billie Jean" (Jim Post, Siegel) – 6:24
"I Wanna Love Ya" (Rollo Radford) – 4:09
"I Think It Was the Wine" (Schwall) – 4:55
"I Don't Want You to Be My Girl" (Siegel) – 6:55
"When I've Been Drinkin'" (Big Bill Broonzy, Schwall) – 4:14
"Hush, Hush" (Jimmy Reed) – 7:22
"Got My Mojo Working" (Preston Foster) – 4:30

Personnel

The Siegel–Schwall Band
Corky Siegel – harmonica, piano; vocals on "Devil", "Hey, Billie Jean", "I Don't Want You to be My Girl", "Hush, Hush"
Jim Schwall – guitar; vocals on "You Don't Love Me Like That", "Leavin'", "I Think It Was the Wine", "When I've Been Drinkin'"
Rollo Radford – bass; vocals on "I Wanna Love Ya"
Sam Lay – drums; vocals on "Got My Mojo Working"

Additional musicians
Alejo Poveda – percussion on "Hey, Billie Jean"

Production
Produced by Corky Siegel, Jim Schwall, and Bruce Iglauer
Recorded by Mark Harder and Timothy R. Powell
Recording assistance by Andras Szanto
Mixed by Jay Shilliday and Tim Hale
Live sound mixed by Kenn Gorz
Cover design and photos by Peter Amft (son of Robert Amft)
Hand lettering by Craig Havighurst
Mastered by Tom Coyne
Liner notes by Lin Brehmer
Special thanks to Seth Mason

Notes

Siegel–Schwall Band albums
1988 live albums
Alligator Records live albums